Michael Mersch (born October 2, 1992) is an American professional ice hockey forward who is currently playing with the Rochester Americans in the American Hockey League (AHL). He was selected by the Los Angeles Kings in the 4th round (110th overall) of the 2011 NHL Entry Draft.

Playing career
Mersch previously played collegiate hockey for the Wisconsin Badgers in the NCAA Men's Division I Big Ten Conference. In his senior year, Mersch's outstanding play was rewarded with a selection to the 2013–14 All-Big Ten First Team.

On April 1, 2014, the Los Angeles Kings signed Mersch to a three-year entry-level contract.

In the 2015–16 season, on December 11, 2015, Michael drew in to his first NHL game for the Los Angeles Kings. The Kings bested the Pittsburgh Penguins in at 3-2 shootout win at the Consol Energy Center. Mersch registered 2 shots and 3 hits during his 11:01 time on ice.

After four full seasons within the Kings organization following the 2017–18 campaign and having been unable to break into the NHL squad, Mersch left as a free agent and signed a two-year, two-way contract with the Dallas Stars on July 1, 2018.

As a free agent from the Stars at the conclusion of his contract, Mersch was un-signed leading into the pandemic delayed 2020–21 season. He agreed to a professional tryout contract with the Rochester Americans of the AHL, the primary affiliate to the Buffalo Sabres, on February 6, 2021.

Family
His father, Mike Mersch, was a defenseman who played professionally in the International Hockey League.

Career statistics

Awards and honors

References

External links 

1992 births
Living people
American men's ice hockey forwards
Los Angeles Kings draft picks
Los Angeles Kings players
Ice hockey players from Illinois
Manchester Monarchs (AHL) players
Ontario Reign (AHL) players
Rochester Americans players
Sportspeople from Park Ridge, Illinois
Texas Stars players
Wisconsin Badgers men's ice hockey players
AHCA Division I men's ice hockey All-Americans